A Moment in Time is the tenth studio album by American country music artist Lorrie Morgan.  The album was released on October 27, 2009 via Stroudavarious. It is a covers album, featuring a total of 14 traditional country classics.

Content
After signing to the newly formed Stroudavarious Records in 2008, Morgan began work on her first studio album since 2004's Show Me How. An album titled I Walk Alone was available through Morgan's fan club and at concerts, but its release to the public was delayed. Instead, A Moment in Time, which consists of traditional country songs, was released on October 27, 2009. The album features fourteen covers, including Mel Street's "Borrowed Angel," Glen Campbell's "By the Time I Get to Phoenix," and Freddie Hart's Number One hit "Easy Loving." Two songs on the album are duets, with Tracy Lawrence ("After the Fire Is Gone") and Raul Malo ("Easy Lovin'").

Promotion
In promotion for the album, Morgan made appearances on CMT and GAC throughout October. She appeared on Daytime on October 29, 2009, and she also appeared on The Daily Buzz on November 3, 2009. She also appeared as a celebrity guest judge on an episode of Iron Chef America. In 2010, Morgan played the role of "Lula" in the Broadway adaptation of Pure Country, the 1992 film starring George Strait.

Track listing
"Cry" (Churchill Kohlman) — 3:53
"Are You Lonesome Tonight?" (Lou Handman, Roy Turk) — 3:17
"After the Fire Is Gone" (L. E. White) — 2:41
featuring Tracy Lawrence
"Leavin' on Your Mind" (Webb Pierce, Wayne Walker) — 3:29
"Borrowed Angel" (Mel Street) — 3:18
"Break It to Me Gently" (Diane Charlotte Lampert, Joe Seneca) — 2:39
"By the Time I Get to Phoenix" (Jimmy Webb) — 3:04
"Easy Lovin'" (Freddie Hart) — 2:45
featuring Raul Malo
"'Til I Get It Right" (Larry Henley, Red Lane) — 3:33
"Alright I'll Sign the Papers" (Mel Tillis) — 2:48
"I'm Always on a Mountain When I Fall" (Chuck Howard) — 2:53
"Misty Blue" (Bob Montgomery) — 3:30
"Wine Me Up" (Billy Deaton, Faron Young) — 2:41
"Lovin' on Backstreets" (Hugh King)— 3:01

Personnel 

 Brittany Allyn – backing vocals
 David Angell – violin
 Monisa Angell – viola
 Maggie Barry – design
 Eddie Bayers – drums
 Niko Bolas – engineer, mixing
 Harold Bradley – tic tac bass, archtop guitar
 Jimmy Capps – acoustic guitar
 Kirsten Cassell – cello
 Mike Casteel – copyist
 Sarah Choi – cello
 David Davidson – violin
 Richard Dodd – mastering
 Connie Ellisor – violin
 Chris Farrell – viola
 Larry Franklin – fiddle
 Paul Franklin – pedal steel guitar

 Carl Gorodetzky – violin
 Kenny Greenberg – electric guitar
 Jim Grosjean – viola
 Allison Hardy – production coordination
 Russ Harrington – photography
 Wes Hightower – backing vocals
 Joe Martino – engineer
 Lorrie Morgan – lead vocals, liner notes
 Gordon Mote – piano
 Cate Myer – violin
 Louis Dean Nunley – backing vocals
 Carole Rabinowitz-Neuen – cello
 Eberhard Ramm – copyist
 John Wesley Ryles – backing vocals

 Pamela Sixfin – violin
 Joe Spivey – acoustic guitar, fiddle
 Julia Tanner – cello
 Russell Terrell – backing vocals
 Ben Terry – Engineer
 Alan Umstead – violin
 Catherine Umstead – violin
 Gary Van Osdale – viola
 Mary Kathryn Van Osdale – violin
 Chip Voorhis – producer, engineer
 Katie Voorhis – production coordination
 Billy Joe Walker, Jr. – acoustic guitar
 Bergen White – composer, backing vocals, vocal arrangement, string arrangements
 Wally Wilson – producer
 Karen Winkelman – violin
 Glenn Worf – upright bass

Chart performance
A Moment in Time debuted at #50 on the U.S. Billboard Top Country Albums chart. It peaked at #40.

References

2009 albums
Lorrie Morgan albums
Covers albums
R&J Records albums